Kamela may refer to:

Kamela, Poland, village
Kamela, Oregon, unincorporated community, United States

People with the surname Kamela
Danielle Kamela or Vanessa Borne (born 1988), American professional wrestler and actress
Paul Kamela (born 1962), Cameroonian boxer

See also
Kamala (disambiguation)